SPiN is an international chain of franchised table tennis clubs and bars. The company was founded in 2009 by actress Susan Sarandon, her then-boyfriend Jonathan Bricklin,  Andrew Gordon, Franck Raharinosy, and Wally Green.

History and locations

The first location of SPiN opened in New York City's Flatiron District on Park Avenue. Susan Sarandon got involved in the project after attending a table tennis party held by Franck Raharinosy.

The first SPiN franchise outside of New York opened in 2010 in Milwaukee (the table tennis bar at this location is now no longer affiliated with the SPiN brand). In 2011, a location opened in Toronto and in 2013 a location (containing a gold-plated ping pong table) opened in Dubai (it later closed due to Dubai's more conservative drinking norms). Further locations have opened (or are planned to open) in Austin, Chicago, Los Angeles, Philadelphia, and San Francisco. As of 2017, there are seven current or planned SPiN locations in the U.S. and Canada.

Austin which is now closed made way for them to open a location in Boston's Seaport.

Concept and marketing
The concept of SPiN was inspired by popular table tennis parties (called "Naked Ping Pong") held regularly by SPiN co-founders Bricklin, Raharinosy, and Green along with Kazuyuki Yokoyama. SPiN franchises incorporate full-service bars and restaurants along with their ping pong tables. The ping pong tables can be reserved by customers (including a "center court" table at many locations) who then play for an hourly cost (or purchase a membership). Location openings have often included celebrity appearances and professional table tennis players. Sarandon and SPiN brand ambassador Soo Yeon Lee have also promoted the chain. The chain has partnered with organizations such as the Glide Foundation to help provide access to table tennis to youth who might be otherwise unable to play.

References

Restaurant chains in the United States
Table tennis venues
Theme restaurants
2009 establishments in New York City